The Liwagu River is a river in West Coast Division of Sabah, Malaysia, flowing eastwards off the southern slope of Mount Kinabalu into the Labuk River in Sandakan Division. Most parts of the river are covered by primary and secondary forests.

Conservation efforts 
The river is home to various habitat including plant, bird and insect species. Its trail in Mount Kinabalu National Park is considered to be a preeminent birder's trail. The trail varies between open vistas and dense thickets, but is predominantly open, skirting the ridge-top as it goes along the north side of the river gorge. Some of the bird species include chlamydochaera jefferyi, chlorocharis emiliae emiliae, eumyias indigo cerviniventris, harpactes whiteheadi, megalaima pulcherrima, napothera crassa Luzon and zosterops atricapilla. Several insects species such as the graphelmis bandukanensis, liparthum, stalk-eyed fly (teleopsis) and myrmarachne mariaelenae also found within the river. The intensive agricultural activities in Kundasang Valley area near the upstream of the river basin however has causing problems concerning the river water quality.

Features 
The river is among the destination for water rafting activities in Sabah aside from Kiulu and Padas River.

See also 
 List of rivers of Malaysia

References

Further reading

External links 
 

Rivers of Sabah
Nature sites of Malaysia
Rivers of Malaysia